is a female Japanese judoka from Tsukuba University. She won the gold medal in the lightweight (57 kg) division at the 2011 World Judo Championships. She is a highly skilled technician of using newaza.

External links
 

1983 births
Living people
Japanese female judoka
Olympic judoka of Japan
Judoka at the 2008 Summer Olympics
Asian Games medalists in judo
Judoka at the 2006 Asian Games
Asian Games silver medalists for Japan
Medalists at the 2006 Asian Games
20th-century Japanese women
21st-century Japanese women